Iram Haq (born January 1, 1976) is a Norwegian-Pakistani actress, screenwriter and director, best known for her feature film, I Am Yours and What Will People Say.

Early life

Haq, a Norwegian-Pakistani, studied art direction at Westerdals School of Communication in Oslo.
She came from a conservative Muslim family who immigrated to Norway. Her upbringing and life events were later a huge inspiration for her movie What Will People Say.

Career
Haq worked for many years as an actress, appearing in theatre, film and television, including Import-Export. She also wrote and starred in the short film Old Faithfull which was selected for the short film competition at the Venice Film Festival in 2004. She made her directorial debut with the short film, Little Miss Eyeflap which premiered at the Sundance Film Festival in 2010. 

Haq's feature film debut, I Am Yours premiered at the Toronto International Film Festival in 2013. It was praised in Variety as "an assured...debut".  The film tells the story of a young Pakistani mother living in Norway and has been lauded for its exceptionally naturalistic performances. The film was selected as the official Norwegian Oscar entry for Best Foreign Language Film.

Her next film What Will People Say has been described as a "heartbreaking female personal drama with culture clashes between two different worlds." The film was inspired by Haq's own life experience. This film was the official entry from Norway to the 91st Academy Awards for Best Foreign Language Film.

Filmography

External links

References

1976 births
Living people
Norwegian people of Pakistani descent
Norwegian film directors
Norwegian film actresses